The taxon Epidendrum alatum refers to:
Epidendrum alatum Bateman, a synonym of Encyclia alata,
Epidendrum alatum Lindl., a synonym of Encyclia ambigua.